Moses Hadas (June 25, 1900, Atlanta, Georgia – August 17, 1966) was an American teacher, a classical scholar, and a translator of numerous works from Greek, Hebrew, Latin, and German.

Life

Raised in Atlanta in a Yiddish-speaking Orthodox Jewish household, his early studies included rabbinical training. He graduated from Jewish Theological Seminary of America (1926) and took his doctorate in classics in 1930. He was fluent in Yiddish, German, ancient Hebrew, ancient Greek, Latin, French, and Italian, and well-versed in other languages.

His most productive years were spent at Columbia University, where he was a colleague of Jacques Barzun and Lionel Trilling. There he bucked the prevailing classical methods of the day—textual criticism and grammar—presenting classics, even in translation, as worthy of study as literary works in their own right.

He embraced television as a tool for education, becoming a telelecturer and a pundit on broadcast television. He also recorded classical works on phonograph and tape.

His daughter Rachel Hadas is a poet, teacher, essayist, and translator. With his first wife, he had a son David Hadas (1931-2004), a professor of English and Religious Studies at Washington University; and Jane Streusand.

Hadas is credited with two celebrated witticisms:

- "This book fills a much-needed gap."

- "Thank you for sending me a copy of your book. I'll waste no time reading it."

Selected works 
Sextus Pompey. 1930
Book of delight, by Joseph ben Meir Zabara; translated by Moses Hadas; with an introduction by Merriam Sherwood. 1932
History of Greek literature. 1950
History of Latin literature. 1952.
Greek poets. 1953
Ancilla to classical reading. 1954
Oedipus. translated with an introd. by Moses Hadas. 1955
History of Rome, from its origins to 529 A.D., as told by the Roman historians. 1956
Thyestes. Translated, with an introduction by Moses Hadas. 1957
Stoic philosophy of Seneca; essays and letters of Seneca.. 1958
Hellenistic culture: fusion and diffusion. 1959
Humanism: the Greek ideal and its survival. 1960
Essential works of Stoicism. 1961
Old wine, new bottles; a humanist teacher at work. 1962
Gibbon's The Decline and Fall of the Roman Empire, Modern abridgment, 1962Hellenistic literature. 1963Style the repository. 1965Heroes and gods; spiritual biographies in antiquity, by Moses Hadas and Morton Smith. 1965Introduction to classical drama. Foreword by Alvin C. Eurich. 1966Living tradition. 1967Solomon Maimon, an autobiography / edited and with a preface by Moses Hadas. 1975

Discography
During the fifties, Hadas recorded several albums of Latin and Greek works on Folkways Records.

 The Story of Virgil's Aeneid: Introduction and Readings in Latin (and English) by Professor Moses Hadas (1955)
 The Latin Language: Introduction and Reading in Latin (and English) by Professor Moses Hadas of Columbia University (1955)
 Plato on the Death of Socrates: Introduction with Readings from the Apology and the Phaedo in Greek & in English trans. (1956)
 Caesar: Readings in Latin and English by Professor Moses Hadas (1956)
 Cicero: Commentary and Readings in Latin and English by Moses Hadas (1956)
 Longus - Daphnis and Chloe: Read by Moses Hadas from His Translation (1958)

References

 External links 
https://dbcs.rutgers.edu/all-scholars/8754-hadas-moses
"The Many Lives of Moses Hadas" by Rachel Hadas, Columbia University Alumni Magazine'', Fall 2001
 - Columbia University
Finding aid to Moses Hadas papers at Columbia University. Rare Book & Manuscript Library.

American classical scholars
1900 births
1966 deaths
Classical scholars of Columbia University
American literary critics
Greek–English translators
Yiddish-speaking people
Jewish Theological Seminary of America alumni
20th-century American non-fiction writers
Jewish American writers
American Orthodox Jews
Jewish scholars
Scholars of ancient Greek literature
Scholars of Latin literature
20th-century translators
People from Atlanta
Place of death missing
20th-century American Jews